Bandusia (minor planet designation: 597 Bandusia) is a minor planet orbiting the Sun.

References

External links
 
 

Background asteroids
Bandusia
Bandusia
S-type asteroids (SMASS)
19060416